William Walter Remington (1917–1954) was an economist employed in various federal government positions until his career was interrupted by accusations of espionage made by the Soviet spy and defector Elizabeth Bentley. He was convicted of perjury in connection with these charges in 1953, and murdered in prison in 1954.

Background
William Walter Remington was born on October 25, 1917, in New York City and raised in Ridgewood, in Bergen County, New Jersey, by Lillian Maude Sutherland (1888-1969) and Frederick C. Remington (1870–1956). His father worked for the Metropolitan Life Insurance Co.; his mother was an art teacher in New York. Remington was admitted to Dartmouth College at age 16, graduating Phi Beta Kappa and magna cum laude in 1939, and earned a Master's degree from Columbia University in 1940. Coming from a branch of the wealthy Remington family of Illion, New York, Remington's parents were demanding and he developed a somewhat unconventional and flamboyant personality. From an early age, he was drawn to radical leftist politics, and declared to his friends that he was a Communist when he was 15. In college, he became active with members of the Young Communist League, and later the Communist Party of the United States. In testimony, Remington stated that while he was a Republican when he entered college, he "moved left quite rapidly" and became a radical but was never a Communist Party or Young Communist League member at Dartmouth. Whether or not he ever officially joined the party later became a point of contention in his legal battles.

Career
Remington was employed in a number of posts, principally as an economist:
Tennessee Valley Authority, Knoxville, Tennessee, September 1936 to May 1937
 Workers Education Committee, Knoxville, April to August 1937
Junior Economist with the National Resources Planning Board, Washington, D.C., May 1940 to July 15, 1941
Associate industrial economist in the Office of Price Administration of the Office for Emergency Management, from July 1941 to February 1942;
Assistant to the Director of the War Production Board, February 1942 to October 1943
Assistant to the Director of Orders and Regulations Bureau in the War Production Board, October 1943 to 1946
President's Council of Economic Advisers, March 1947 to March 1948

For his position with the Office of Price Administration, Remington was required to undergo a loyalty-security check, which began in 1941. He admitted having been active in Communist-allied groups such as the American Peace Mobilization, but denied any sympathy with communism and swore under oath that he was not and had never been a member of the Communist Party. His leftist affiliations raised concerns, but the investigation was superficial and his security clearance was approved.

Alleged espionage

In March 1942 and continuing for two years, Remington had occasional meetings with Elizabeth Bentley at which he passed her information. This material included data on airplane production and other matters concerning the aircraft industry, as well as some information on an experimental process for manufacturing synthetic rubber. Remington later claimed that he was unaware that Bentley was connected with the Communist Party, that he believed she was a journalist and researcher, and that the information he gave her was not secret. Bentley was a Communist and an espionage agent for the Soviet Union, who in 1945 broke with the Communists and became an informer for the FBI. She then implicated a number of her contacts, including Remington. Bentley's revelations of Soviet espionage activities in the United States received a great deal of press attention. She identified more than 80 Americans—including several employees of government offices—as working for the Soviets, of whom only William Remington was still working in a government position.

Acting on Bentley's information, the FBI began secret surveillance of Remington in late 1945. Remington was by this time disillusioned with communism and had broken off his relationships with radical organizations, so the investigation revealed nothing of interest.
In 1946, Remington was working with the Office of War Mobilization and Reconversion. From there he transferred in March 1947 to a position with the President's Council of Economic Advisers, where he was paid an annual salary of $10,305. Because the FBI was keeping Bentley's testimony and its investigation of Remington secret, it raised no objection, with the result that Remington remained in fairly high-level government posts.

In 1947, Remington was interviewed by the FBI and also questioned before a federal grand jury in New York City about the information he had given to Elizabeth Bentley. He testified that no secret information was involved, and the issue seemed to end there. In an apparent attempt to bolster belief in his innocence, Remington became an anti-communist informer from this time and for the following year. He sent the FBI information on over fifty people, only four of whom were connected with his own case. Most of those he named he had never met. He accused them of being Communists, isolationists, Negro nationalists, or "extreme liberals." He also verbally attacked his wife Ann, from whom he was now estranged, and his mother-in-law Elizabeth Moos, both avowed Communists.

Another loyalty investigation of Remington was opened early in 1948, and in June, he was relieved of his duties pending the findings of that investigation. In July of that year, the New York World-Telegram published a series of articles about Elizabeth Bentley, and the Senate Permanent Subcommittee on Investigations opened hearings to investigate her charges. At these hearings, Bentley made her accusations against Remington public and Remington in turn denied them. The Washington Post called him "a boob...who was duped by clever Communist agents." At his loyalty review hearings, Remington downplayed his earlier connections with Communist and leftist organizations and claimed that his wife's adherence to Communist doctrine was the reason for the end of their marriage.

While testifying before the Senate, Bentley was protected from libel suits. When she repeated her charge that Remington was a Communist on NBC Radio's Meet the Press, he sued her and NBC for libel. At this point, Remington's case acquired considerable notoriety. When Remington's lawyers attempted to subpoena Bentley, she initially could not be found, prompting headlines of "RED WITNESS "MISSING" AT 100-G SLANDER SUIT" and the like. When she finally reappeared, she was subpoenaed for the libel suit. She refused to testify at Remington's loyalty hearing. The Loyalty Review Board noted that the only serious evidence against Remington was "the uncorroborated statement of a woman who refuses to submit herself to cross-examination," and cleared Remington to return to his government post. The libel suit was settled out of court shortly thereafter, with NBC paying Remington $10,000.

Second round of investigations

In 1950, the FBI and the federal grand jury in New York City reopened their investigations of Remington, and the House Un-American Activities Committee (HUAC) opened a third. Because of continuing suspicions about him, Remington had been demoted at the Commerce Department, and his once-promising career in the Truman administration was stagnant. Ann Remington, now divorced from him, was subpoenaed to testify before the grand jury. Initially reluctant, she testified that her husband had been a dues-paying member of the Communist Party, and that he had given secret information to Elizabeth Bentley while knowing that Bentley was a Communist. A few days later she recanted, and stated that she would claim marital privilege and refuse to testify against her ex-husband in any trial. The grand jury decided to indict Remington for committing perjury when he denied ever being a member of the Communist Party.

Trials

First trial (1950-1951)
Remington's first trial began in late December 1950. Roy Cohn, later to become famous as Joseph McCarthy's chief counsel and already a noted anti-communist, joined the prosecution's legal team. "Elizabeth Bentley later supplied a wealth of detail about Remington's involvement with her and the espionage conspiracy. Remington's defense was that he had never handled any classified material, hence could not have given any to Miss Bentley. But she remembered all the facts about the rubber-from-garbage invention. We had searched through the archives and discovered the files on the process. We also found the aircraft schedules, which were set up exactly as she said, and inter office memos and tables of personnel which proved Remington had access to both these items. We also discovered Remington's application for a naval commission in which he specifically pointed out that he was, in his present position with the Commerce Department, entrusted with secret military information involving airplanes, armaments, radar, and the Manhattan Project (the atomic bomb)."

During the trial eleven witnesses claimed they knew Remington was a communist. This included Elizabeth Bentley, Ann Remington, Professor Howard Bridgeman of Tufts University, Kenneth McConnell, a Communist organizer in Knoxville, Rudolph Bertram and Christine Benson, who worked with him at the Tennessee Valley Authority and Paul Crouch, who claimed he provided Remington with copies of the southern edition of the communist newspaper, the Daily Worker.

Ann Remington reversed herself again and testified that her ex-husband had been a Communist Party member and that he had knowingly given secret information to Elizabeth Bentley. Bentley testified, repeating her charge that Remington had given her secret information, saying with regard to the synthetic rubber formula, "He said to me that...he thought that the Russians would need something very much like this." The prosecution also showed that Remington had handled secret documents that were somewhat similar to the aircraft production information that Bentley said she received from Remington.

During the trial, the defense attorneys revealed that John Brunini, the foreman of the grand jury that indicted Remington, had a personal and financial relationship with Elizabeth Bentley and had agreed to co-author a book with her.

Remington was convicted after a seven-week trial. Judge Gregory E. Noonan handed down a sentence of five years - the maximum for perjury - noting that Remington's act of perjury had involved disloyalty to his country. Remington's conviction was celebrated by many. A  Washington Daily News editorial said: "William W. Remington now joins the odiferous list of young Communist punks who wormed their way upward in the Government under the New Deal. He was sentenced to five years in prison, and he should serve every minute of it. In Russia, he would have been shot without trial."

Remington's attorneys appealed the verdict, and the judicial panel hearing the case included Judge Learned Hand, one of America's most eminent jurists. The conviction was overturned on the grounds that Judge Noonan's instructions to the jury were too vague as to exactly what constituted "membership" in the Communist Party, and a new trial was ordered. Hand also criticized grand jury foreman John Brunini and Thomas Donegan, the assistant to the Attorney General who directed the grand jury investigation, for Brunini's relationship with Bentley and for "judicial improprieties" in their abusive treatment of both Ann and William Remington during questioning.

Second trial (1953)
Instead of retrying Remington under the existing indictment, the government presented a new one charging Remington with five counts of perjury based on his testimony during the first trial. The charge from the first trial, that he perjured himself when denying he had ever been a Communist Party member, was not included.

The second Remington trial began in January 1953 with Judge Vincent L. Leibell presiding. It lasted only eight days. The jury found Remington guilty of two counts, for lying when he said he had not given secret information to Elizabeth Bentley and that he did not know of the existence of the Young Communist League, which had a chapter at Dartmouth while Remington was a student there. Leibell sentenced Remington to three years in prison.

Imprisonment and murder

While his attorneys prepared another appeal, Remington began his sentence at Danbury Federal Correctional Institution where he became friends with fellow prisoner, nonviolent action theorist Gene Sharp, before being transferred to Lewisburg. The appeals court upheld the original verdict, and in February 1954, the Supreme Court refused to hear the case.

One of Remington's fellow inmates at Lewisburg was George McCoy, a violent man with an I.Q. of 61. McCoy was known to have made a number of angry remarks about Remington's communism. On the morning of November 22, 1954, McCoy convinced another inmate, 17-year-old juvenile delinquent Lewis Cagle, Jr., to join him in attacking Remington as he slept. Cagle used a piece of brick in a sock as a weapon, striking Remington four times on the head. Two days later, November 24, 1954, Remington died of his injuries. The prison warden described it to Remington's second wife as "not a personal attack against Bill...but just the actions of a couple of hoodlums who got all worked up by...the publicity about Communists." The FBI stated that robbery was the motive for the crime. His funeral was held in Ridgewood, New Jersey on November 28, 1954.

Aftermath
Press attention focused on whether more should have been done to protect him in prison, and whether his murder was motivated by anti-communism. When Cagle confessed, the FBI instructed him to describe the crime as if he and McCoy had been trying to rob Remington.
When McCoy confessed four days later, he said he hated Remington for being a Communist and denied any robbery motive.

Worried that Cagle and McCoy's confessions might be ruled inadmissible and afraid that a jury would be sympathetic towards men who murdered a Communist, U.S. attorney J. Julius Levy accepted pleas of second degree murder from McCoy and Cagle. They received life sentences.

Legacy
Remington's biographer Gary May concludes: "Clearly, Remington was no political innocent duped by the Communists, and his conviction for perjury seems justified. Yet Remington was no pro-Soviet automaton, no slave to Party or ideology, and not even the FBI, at least privately, was willing to classify him as a Russian spy."

See also
McCarthyism
Communist Party of the United States

References

External links
 FBI Vault Declassified files
 Library of Congress 1951 photo of Remington with children

Sources
Gary May, Un-American Activities: The Trials of William Remington (NY: Oxford University Press, 1994)

1917 births
1954 deaths
People from Ridgewood, New Jersey
Dartmouth College alumni
Columbia University alumni
American civil servants
Espionage in the United States
American spies for the Soviet Union
People murdered in Pennsylvania
American people who died in prison custody
Prisoners who died in United States federal government detention
American murder victims
American perjurers
Murdered criminals
New Hampshire Republicans
Male murder victims
 Deaths by beating in the United States
 1945 murders in the United States